Bordeaux was an unincorporated community in Thurston County, in the U.S. state of Washington.

History
A post office called Bordeaux was established in 1903, and remained in operation until 1942. The community was named after Thomas Bordeaux, a businessman in the lumber industry. Lumbering operations ended in the 1940s once the timber had been extracted, and the town's population dwindled. When the town's sawmill shut down in the mid-20th century, its last remaining inhabitants abandoned it. The site of Bordeaux is now located on private property which is inaccessible to the public.

References

Unincorporated communities in Thurston County, Washington
Unincorporated communities in Washington (state)